Clothes Make the Pirate is a 1925 American silent comedy film directed by Maurice Tourneur and starring Leon Errol and Dorothy Gish. The film was written by Marion Fairfax from the novel of the same name by Holman Francis Day.

Synopsis
The film is a comedy that centers on a disgruntled 18th-century Bostonian, played by Errol, who while wishing that he was a pirate, dons the clothes and play-acts the part. He is mistaken for the real pirate, Dixie Bull (played by Walter Law) whom Errol, of course, bumps into later in the film. More importantly, Errol "slays" the villain and puts his foot upon the pirate's head. This is more than enough and he heads back home to his unappreciated wife, played by Dorothy Gish.

Cast

Reception
Contemporary reviewers of the time claimed Errol was miscast, perhaps for the comedic cowardice of the part. Variety gave the film a poor review, stating that the children would like it. However other reviews, such as that in the Los Angeles Times of January 10, 1926 gave the film, as a satire, generally good reviews. However, the camera work of Cronjager was critically acclaimed.

Preservation
With no prints of Clothes Make the Pirate located in any film archives, it is a lost film. A one minute trailer, however, does survive.

References

External links

Movie trailer (1:08) at Internet Archive

1925 films
1925 lost films
1925 adventure films
1920s historical comedy films
American historical comedy films
American silent feature films
American black-and-white films
Films directed by Maurice Tourneur
Films set in the 18th century
Films set in Boston
Films set in the Thirteen Colonies
Films based on American novels
First National Pictures films
1920s English-language films
Pirate films
Lost American films
Lost adventure comedy films
1925 comedy films
1920s American films
Silent American comedy films
Silent adventure comedy films